Diplachne is a genus of plants in the grass family, widespread over much of the world.

Species
 Diplachne cuspidata Launert - Namibia
 Diplachne fascicularis (Lam.) P.Beauv. - North America, West Indies, South America
 Diplachne festuciformis H.Scholz - Libya
 Diplachne fusca (L.) P.Beauv. ex Roem. & Schult. - North America, West Indies, South America, Asia, Africa, Australia
 Diplachne gigantea Launert - Tanzania, Angola, Zambia, Botswana

Formerly included
over 100 species once considered part of Diplachne but now considered better suited to other genera: Bewsia Catapodium Cleistogenes Disakisperma Enteropogon Eragrostis Festuca Gouinia Leptocarydion Leptochloa Neyraudia Odyssea Orinus Pogonarthria Psilolemma Trichoneura Tripogon Triraphis Verticordia

References

Chloridoideae
Poaceae genera
Taxa named by Palisot de Beauvois